Typocaeta kenyana is a species of beetle in the family Cerambycidae. It was described by Teocchi in 1991.

References

Agapanthiini
Beetles described in 1991